XHRW-FM is a radio station on 97.7 FM in Tampico, Tamaulipas, Mexico.

History
Raul Wertt received the concession for XHRW-FM in 1974, specifying operation on 99.3 MHz (later used by XHETU-FM) with an ERP of three kilowatts. In 1990, the station moved to 97.7 and has increased power twice in its history.

References

Radio stations in Tampico
Radio stations established in 1974
1974 establishments in Mexico